Andrew David Smith (born September 24, 1993) is an American professional baseball pitcher for the New York Mets of Major League Baseball (MLB).

Amateur career
Smith graduated from Crowley High School in Crowley, Texas in 2012. In 2011, as a junior at Crowley, he was 10-1 with a 1.90 ERA in 85 innings. Undrafted out of high school in the 2012 Major League Baseball draft, he enrolled at Dallas Baptist University where he played college baseball for the Dallas Baptist Patriots. As a junior at Dallas Baptist in 2015, Smith compiled a 3-2 record and 3.97 ERA in 25 appearances for the Patriots.

Professional career

Detroit Tigers
Smith was selected by the Detroit Tigers in the third round of the 2015 Major League Baseball draft. He signed with Detroit for $575,800 and was assigned to the GCL Tigers. After one appearance in the GCL, Smith was promoted to the Connecticut Tigers. He was promoted to the West Michigan Whitecaps in August and he finished the season there. In 31 relief innings pitched between the three clubs, Smith was 3-0 with a 0.29 ERA. In 2016, he returned to West Michigan and spent the whole season there, going 1-2 with a 2.96 ERA in 35 relief appearances. He began 2017 with the Lakeland Flying Tigers.

Tampa Bay Rays
On April 28, 2017, Smith was traded to the Tampa Bay Rays as the player to be named later in the Mikie Mahtook trade. Tampa Bay assigned him to the Charlotte Stone Crabs. He was promoted to the Durham Bulls for one game in early July before returning to Charlotte. On July 18, he was promoted to the Montgomery Biscuits.

New York Mets
On July 27, 2017, Smith was traded to the New York Mets in exchange for Lucas Duda. The Mets assigned him to the Binghamton Rumble Ponies and he finished the season there. In 42 relief appearances between Lakeland, Charlotte, Durham, Montgomery, and Binghamton, Smith pitched to a 4-4 record with a 1.65 ERA and 0.90 WHIP. He began 2018 with Binghamton and was promoted to the Las Vegas 51s after two games.

Smith was promoted to the major leagues by the Mets on June 22, 2018. He made his major league debut the next night at Citi Field against the Los Angeles Dodgers, pitching one scoreless inning in relief as the Dodgers defeated New York 8-3. He finished his 2018 season with the Mets, going 1-1 with a 3.54 ERA in 27 relief appearances. Smith underwent Tommy John surgery during 2019 spring training, forcing him to miss the year.

Smith returned to game action in 2020, appearing in eight games for the Mets, registering a 6.43 ERA with seven strikeouts in as many innings pitched. In 2021, although he missed time due to injury, Smith still made thirty relief appearances for the Mets, going 3-1 with a 2.40 ERA and 41 strikeouts over  innings.

On April 29, 2022, Smith pitched in relief in a combined no-hitter against the Philadelphia Phillies, pitching  innings.

References

External links

1993 births
Living people
Baseball players from Fort Worth, Texas
Major League Baseball pitchers
New York Mets players
Dallas Baptist Patriots baseball players
Gulf Coast Tigers players
Connecticut Tigers players
West Michigan Whitecaps players
Lakeland Flying Tigers players
Charlotte Stone Crabs players
Durham Bulls players
Montgomery Biscuits players
Binghamton Rumble Ponies players
Las Vegas 51s players
Syracuse Mets players
Mat-Su Miners players